"Spend the Night in Love" is a 1980 song by The Four Seasons. It was composed by Lenny Goldsmith and Judy Parker (aka Bob Gaudio) and produced by Gaudio. It was a non-album single as a studio-recorded version. However, a live version of the song had first been included on their 1980 live LP, Reunited.

The song reached number 91 on the US Billboard Hot 100. 

"Spend the Night in Love" became a major hit in South Africa, where it peaked at number four.  The song was the group's only charting single during the 1980s.

Charts

References

External links
 Lyrics of this song
  

1980 singles
The Four Seasons (band) songs
Songs written by Bob Gaudio
Song recordings produced by Bob Gaudio
1980 songs
Curb Records singles
Warner Records singles